Yarımca (also, Yarmıca and Yarymdzha) is a village and municipality in the Babek District of Nakhchivan, Azerbaijan.  It has a population of 1,336.

References 

Populated places in Babek District